Ecclefechan (Scottish Gaelic: Eaglais Fheichein) is a small village located in Dumfries and Galloway in the south of Scotland.

The village is famous for being the birthplace of Thomas Carlyle.

The A74(M) motorway runs immediately north of the village and Junction 19 is just northwest of the village.

The High Street of the village has a burn which runs through a culvert below it. This culvert was constructed in 1875 by Dr George Arnott at his own expense.

Etymology
The name Ecclefechan was recorded as Egilfeichane in 1507, and is of Brittonic origin. The first element is eglẹ:s, meaning "a church" (c.f. Welsh eglwys). The second element is the equivalent of Welsh fechan, meaning "little". Comparable Welsh toponyms include Eglwysfach and Llanfechan.

A lesser likelihood is that the name commemorates Féchín of Fore, a 7th-century Irish saint.

Governance
Ecclefechan is in the parliamentary constituency of Dumfriesshire, Clydesdale and Tweeddale, David Mundell is the current Conservative Party Member of Parliament (MP).

Ecclefechan is part of the South Scotland region in the Scottish Parliament, being in the constituency of Dumfriesshire. Oliver Mundell of the Conservatives is the Member of the Scottish Parliament (MSP).

Before Brexit for the European Parliament its residents voted to elect Members of the European Parliament (MEP)s for the Scotland constituency.

For Local Government purposes, it belongs to the "Annandale East + Eskdale Ward" of the Dumfries and Galloway Council Area. The village does not have its own Parish Council.

Places of interest

Thomas Carlyle's birthplace "The Arched House" is a tourist attraction and has been maintained by the National Trust for Scotland since 1936. According to letters from Carlyle written to Charles Gavin Duffy in the summer of 1846, his mother's farm in Ecclefechan was at that time located in Scotsbrig (Charles Gavin Duffy, 'Conversations with Carlyle, NY: Scribner's Son, 1892, pp. 18–20). From Scotsbrig, Carlyle watched the construction of the Caledonian Railway and complained to Duffy of Ecclefechan's potato blight, and the abundance of railway navvies from Lancashire, Ireland, and Yorkshire, finding his visit home disturbed by the "black potato-fields, and all roads and lanes overrun with drunken navvies" (ibid., pp. 19–20). Carlyle comments that "I find that the Irish are best on point of behaviour" because they sent their money home to their families and did not spend it on whiskey (ibid., p. 20).

Ecclefechan lies at the foot of a large Caledonian hillfort, Burnswark, besieged by the Roman army in 140 AD. Its flat top dominates the horizon.

Not far from the village is the Robgill Tower, built by the Clan Irvine. In the 1880s, an adjoining home was built. The tower was one of a number of structures built along the border as protection against incursions by the British.

Notable residents

 Thomas Carlyle (1795–1881), the essayist, satirist,  political philosopher and historian was born in Ecclefechan on 4 December 1795 at The Arched House. Carlyle left Ecclefechan at the age of thirteen and walked the  journey to Edinburgh in order to attend university. In 1828 Carlyle moved to Craigenputtock with his wife Jane. He never forgot his roots and insisted that Ecclefechan should become his final resting place. He was buried in Ecclefechan churchyard on 5 February 1881.
 Archibald Arnott (1772–1855), Napoleon's doctor on St Helena, was born in Ecclefechan on  18 April 1772 at Kirconnel Hall.  He returned to Ecclefechan in his retirement and he was also buried in the Ecclefechan churchyard.
 William Harkness (1837–1903), an astronomer, was born at Ecclefechan.
 Janet Little (1759-1813), a poet who published The Poetical Works of Janet Little, The Scotch Milkmaid in 1791 was born at Nether Bogside in Ecclefechan parish. She was a contemporary of Robert Burns.
 James Bryson (J.B.) McLachlan (1869-1937), Scottish-Canadian trade unionist and communist politician was born in  Ecclefechan in 1869.

Culture
Robert Burns (1759–1796) composed a song entitled The Lass O' Ecclefechan.

Ecclefechan also has links to the Guinness family, the story of the Whistling Ploughboy of Ecclefechan under the title A Guinness With a Difference was produced by ministries and charts the ploughboy's influence under God on the Guinness family.

"Oor Wullie" of The Sunday Post fame once got a day off school for spelling "Ecclefechan" correctly, and the Jocks and the Geordies of The Dandy once reminisced the Great Battle of Ecclefechan''.

Local produce
Local produce includes:- 
 The Ecclefechan Tart, which gained national prominence in late 2007 when the supermarket Sainsbury's promoted it as an alternative to mince pies at Christmas, and the tarts sold over 50,000 packs in November 2007. The tart is a mixture of butter and dried fruits in a pastry shell. A version made by the Moray confectioner Walkers is now nationally available throughout the United Kingdom.
 The Fechan, a blended Scotch whisky, whose label denotes the Arched House.

See also
Charles Gavan Duffy, Conversations with Carlyle, 1892, p. 16.
Hoddom Castle
Siege of Burnswark

References 

Villages in Dumfries and Galloway
Thomas Carlyle